"I Know What You Did Last Summer" is a song by Canadian singer Shawn Mendes and Cuban-American singer Camila Cabello. The song serves as Cabello's debut single as a solo artist and was released as the lead single from the reissue of Mendes' debut studio album, Handwritten Revisited (2015), via Island Records on November 18, 2015. It reached the top 20 on the US Billboard Hot 100 and on the Canadian Hot 100. Mendes and Cabello promoted the song with several televised performances, including on The Tonight Show Starring Jimmy Fallon and at the 2016 People's Choice Awards. Mendes and Cabello later collaborated on "Señorita" in June 2019.

Background and composition
"I Know What You Did Last Summer" was written backstage spontaneously on one of Taylor Swift's The 1989 World Tour stops, in which Mendes was an opening act and Cabello was the surprise guest as part of the group Fifth Harmony. "We were just backstage. There were like 100 people in my dressing room at the time, and it was madness back there, but I had this guitar and I was just jamming out, and we basically wrote a pre-chorus and a chorus in like 30 minutes," Mendes said in a video released about the making of this song. "And we planned to go into the studio, and it was like an 11-hour studio session where we finished writing the song." After a live performance on Live with Kelly and Michael, Cabello said, "We were just kind of jamming out. We weren’t really just writing a song. We kind of started spitting out melodies and put lyrics to it; I don't think we knew we had a song."

The artists co-wrote "I Know What You Did Last Summer" with its producers Ido Zmishlany and Noel Zancanella, with Bill Withers receiving songwriting credits for the sampling of his 1971 single "Ain't No Sunshine" and Ryan Tedder also receiving songwriting credits. Cabello described "I Know What You Did Last Summer" as a "conversation between two people in a relationship where it's dying, but nobody wants to admit that it's dying." The song is sung in A minor, and set in common time with a tempo of 114 bpm.

Commercial performance
"I Know What You Did Last Summer" debuted at number ninety-seven on Billboard Hot 100 for the chart dated December 5, 2015 and jumped to number fifty-five on the following week. On the week ending January 9, 2016, the song jumped from number forty-six to number thirty-three. The song has since peaked at number twenty for the chart dated January 30, 2016, becoming Mendes' second top 20 single, after "Stitches", which peaked at number four on October 31, 2015.

Music video
A music video for the song was released on November 20, 2015, and was directed by Ryan Pallotta. In the video, Mendes and Cabello, ages 17 and 18 respectively at the time of the making of the song and filming of the video, are seen walking through a dark and desolated landscape. They keep trying to walk towards each other but aren't moving. They are seen weathering a sandstorm, followed by a snowstorm and a rainstorm which culminates in a standoff of sorts. The music video has over 402 million views and 4 million likes as of February 2023.

Live performances
Mendes and Cabello's first televised performance of "I Know What You Did Last Summer" was on Live with Kelly and Michael on November 20, 2015. They also performed the song on The Late Late Show with James Corden on November 23, 2015, and at Pitbull's New Year's Revolution on December 31, 2015, in Miami, Florida. Mendes and Cabello performed the track again on The Tonight Show Starring Jimmy Fallon on January 4, 2016.

Preceded by a performance of "Stitches", Mendes and Cabello sang "I Know What You Did Last Summer" at the 2016 People's Choice Awards. They also performed together on The Ellen DeGeneres Show on February 15, 2016.
Mendes and Cabello performed the track again at the Radio City Music Hall on March 5, 2016, in New York.

Mendes and Cabello also performed the track while on the 2015 iHeartRadio Jingle Ball tour in December, on the following dates: 1, 4, 11, 16, 18 and 19.

Mendes has added the single to his setlist on his ongoing tour, Shawn Mendes: The Tour, as a medley with "Señorita"—which Cabello also features in—and "Mutual". The single was also added to his setlist on his first solo concert tour, Shawn Mendes World Tour.

Track listings 
Digital download
"I Know What You Did Last Summer"  – 3:43

Digital download – Radio Edit
"I Know What You Did Last Summer" (Radio Edit) – 3:11

Accolades

Charts

Weekly charts

Year-end charts

Certifications

References

2015 singles
2015 songs
Shawn Mendes songs
Camila Cabello songs
Songs about infidelity
Songs written by Noel Zancanella
Songs written by Camila Cabello
Songs written by Bill Withers
Songs written by Shawn Mendes
Songs written by Ido Zmishlany
Song recordings produced by Noel Zancanella
Island Records singles
Male–female vocal duets